Eucalyptus erosa is a species of tree that is endemic to a small area of Queensland. It has rough, fibrous to stringy grey bark, lance-shaped to curved adult leaves, flower buds arranged in groups of between nine and thirteen, white flowers and cup-shaped to hemispherical fruit.

Description
It has rough, fibrous to stringy, grey bark on the trunk and branches. Flowering has been recorded in May and the flowers are white.

Taxonomy and naming
Eucalyptus erosa was first described in 2005 by Anthony Bean from a specimen he collected in the Maranoa district in 1981 and the description was published in the journal Austrobaileya. The specific epithet (erosa) is a Latin word meaning "eaten away", "gnawed" or "nibbled", referring to the edges of the adult leaves.

Distribution and habitat
This eucalypt grows in sandy soils derived from sandstone and is only known from the Mt Moffatt section of the Carnarvon National Park and an adjacent grazing property.

References

erosa
Myrtales of Australia
Trees of Australia
Flora of Queensland
Plants described in 2005